Auria—also known as Oria—was an early consort of Pamplona. She is known from a single historical source, the Códice de Roda, which only gives her name and not her parentage. Historian and professor Antonio Rei has put forward the hypothesis that she could have been the granddaughter of Musa ibn Musa al-Qasawi, while genealogist Christian Settipani suggested this and two other alternatives when addressing her possible parentage.

Marriage and issue
She married King Fortún Garcés of Pamplona, who died in 922.

These are the children of Auria and Fortún:
Íñigo Fortúnez
Aznar Fortúnez
Velasco Fortúnez
Lope Fortúnez
Onneca Fortúnez

References

Sources 

Aguado Bleye, Pedro; Alcazar Molina, Cayetano Prehistoria, edades antigua y media.
Collins, Roger (2012). Caliphs and Kings: Spain, 796-1031. Blackwell publishing.
 

 

Navarrese royal consorts
10th-century people from the Kingdom of Pamplona
9th-century people from the Kingdom of Pamplona
10th-century Spanish women
9th-century Spanish women